JDS Uzushio (SS-566) was the lead boat of thes. She was commissioned on 21 January 1971.

Construction and career
Uzushio was laid down at Kawasaki Heavy Industries Kobe Shipyard on 25 September 1968 and launched on 11 March 1970. She was commissioned on 21 January 1971, into the 1st Submarine Group as their flagship.

On 2 February 1972, she was transferred to the 4th Submarine, which was newly commissioned under the 1st Submarine Group, along with JDS Makishio, who was commissioned on the same day.

On 16 October 1973 , the 4th Submarine was reorganized into the 2nd Submarine Group, which was newly formed under the Self-Defense Fleet .

Participated in Hawaii dispatch training from August 16 to November 1, 1974.

She was decommissioned on 24 March 1987. The number of dives was 1,226, the time underwater was 28,244 hours and 34 minutes, the number of surfaced hours was 8,705 hours and 23 minutes, and the total itinerary was 218,125.3 nautical miles.

Citations

External links

1970 ships
Uzushio-class submarines
Ships built by Kawasaki Heavy Industries